Lebanese people in Qatar have a population exceeding 25,000 Lebanese people form one of the largest community of non-citizen Arabs in Qatar. In addition, an increasing number of Lebanese students seeking education and career opportunities opted for the country in light of its relatively reputable institutions across the Middle East. Most of the Lebanese people in Qatar live mainly in the capital city of Doha.

Lebanese people in Qatar
Ahmed Omar
Nada Zeidan

See also
 Lebanese diaspora
 Armenians in Qatar

References

Arabs in Qatar
Qatari people of Lebanese descent
 
Qatar
Ethnic groups in Qatar
Lebanon–Qatar relations
Qatar
Qatar